Climate Justice Action (CJA) is transnational coalition of organizations that seeks to prevent climate change and achieve climate justice. CJA formed as part of the alternative mobilisation around the 2009 United Nations Climate Change Conference in Copenhagen, and organised mass Direct actions during the conference.

Aims
The Network has a strong emphasis on climate justice, and has the following goals:

 To promote and strengthen the rights and voices of Indigenous and affected peoples (including workers) in confronting the climate crisis. To support reparations and the repayment of ecological debt to the Global South by industrialized rich countries
 To build a global movement for climate justice that encourages urgent action to avoid catastrophic climate change.
 To highlight the critical role of biodiversity in weathering the climate crisis, and to defend the existence of all species.
 To expose the roles of false and market-based climate “solutions” as well as corporate domination of climate negotiations in worsening the climate crisis.
 To advance alternatives that can provide real and just solutions to the climate crisis.
 To both sharpen our understanding of, and to address, the root social, ecological, political and economic causes of the climate crisis toward a total systemic transformation of our society.
 Our network is committed to working with respect, trust and unity towards these goals.

Documents
CJA has produced the following documents:
 CJA aims and principcals of working
 Call for action (ahead of Copenhagen climate summit)
 Discussion paper: What does climate justice mean in europe

News articles
 CNN article: Climate protesters descend on Copenhagen
 Guardian article: copenhagen-activist-trial
 Guardian article:copenhagen-police-tactics-revealed

See also
 Climate Justice Now

References

External links
 Climate Justice Action website

International climate change organizations